Vladimir Vladimirovich Graudyn (born 26 August 1963) is a Russian former track and field athlete who competed in the 800 metres for the Soviet Union. He was a silver medallist at both the IAAF World Indoor Championships and European Athletics Indoor Championships in 1987.

Graudyn represented his country at the World Championships in Athletics that same year and also raced at the 1988 Summer Olympics. He was a three-time national champion. His personal best for the 800 m was 1:44.10 minutes.

Career
Born in Moscow, Graudyn joined the Spartak Minsk based in the Belarus SSR. He first emerged at national level at the 1986 Soviet Spartakiad, where he was the gold medallist in the 1500 metres in a time of 3:44.29 minutes. He also won was the 800 m champion at the Soviet Indoor Athletics Championships that year – a title which he defended the following year. On his major international debut he reached the semi-finals at the 1986 European Athletics Championships.

Graudyn had most of his success at international in the 1987 season. At the 1987 European Athletics Indoor Championships he took the silver medal in the 800 m behind Dutchman Rob Druppers in a tactical race. The following month he competed at the 1987 IAAF World Indoor Championships and repeated that finish, coming second but this time to Brazil's José Luiz Barbosa. He was the Soviet Union's only ever medallist in the men's event at that competition. He was the Soviet Union's best performer in the 800 m at the 1987 World Championships in Athletics, missing qualification for the final by a margin of three hundredths and outperforming Andrey Sudnik.

Graudyn set a personal best of 1:44.10 minutes at the Bislett Games in 1988 – this time placed him in the top ten in the world that year and he was third among Europeans, bettered only by British duo Steve Cram and Sebastian Coe. However, he failed to match this form at the 1988 Seoul Olympics, being eliminated in the quarter-final round. That proved to be the last major international event that he ran at. His wife, Yuliya Graudyn, would later win world and European medals for Russia.

National titles
Soviet Spartakiad
1500 metres: 1986
Soviet Indoor Athletics Championships
800 metres: 1986, 1987

International competitions

Notes
 Some sources list his birth date as 4 October 1963.

References

External links

Living people
1963 births
Athletes from Moscow
Russian male middle-distance runners
Soviet male middle-distance runners
Olympic athletes of the Soviet Union
Athletes (track and field) at the 1988 Summer Olympics
World Athletics Championships athletes for the Soviet Union
World Athletics Indoor Championships medalists